The Lewiston-Auburn citylink is the primary provider of mass transportation in Androscoggin County, Maine. Founded in 1976 after a joint agreement between the twin cities of Lewiston and Auburn, the bureau markets itself through its distinct fleet of purple buses. Service runs Monday through Friday along nine routes.

Route list
1 Main St
2 Sabattus St
3 Lisbon St
4 New Auburn
5 Minot Ave
6 College St
7 Auburn Mall
8 Downtown
9 CMCC

References

External links
 CityLink

Bus transportation in Maine
Lewiston–Auburn, Maine
Transit agencies in Maine
Transport companies established in 1976
1976 establishments in Maine